NGC 5544 is a barred spiral galaxy in the constellation Boötes. It is interacting with spiral galaxy NGC 5545.

References

External links

Image NGC 5544
http://seds.org/
Distance

NGC 05544
5544
09142
199
Interacting galaxies
Barred spiral galaxies